Sørkapp Bird Sanctuary is a bird reserve at Svalbard, Norway, established in 1973. It includes Sørkappøya and other islands off Sørkapp Land, Spitsbergen. The protected area covers a total area of 3,599ha

References

Bird sanctuaries in Svalbard
Protected areas established in 1973
1973 establishments in Norway
Sørkappøya